The Monastery and Church of San Pietro (St Peter) is a building complex located on Via San Pietro in central Modena, Italy. The site still hosts an active Benedictine monastery, and the temple now serves as a parish church.

History

The Benedictine Abbey was founded in the year 983, and the adjacent church was rebuilt during 1476 to 1518. The work has been attributed to Pietro Barabani of Carpi.

The external frieze of the church peculiarly depicts secular images of hippocamps and winged satyrs completed by the brothers Bisogni. The interior was decorated during the early Renaissance by local artists, including terracotta sculptures by Antonio Begarelli. The sacristy has engraved choir benches (1548) by Gianfrancesco da Cremona. The interior has altarpieces by Francesco Bianchi Ferrari, Ercole dell'Abate, Giacomo Cavedone, Giovanni Gherardo Dalle Catene, J. van Ghelde, Giovanni Battista Ingoni, Ludovico Lana, Pellegrino Munari, Girolamo Romanino, C. Ricci, Ercole Setti, Giovanni Taraschi, Francesco da Verona, and others. The sacristy has frescoes attributed to Girolamo da Vignola. The wooden choir was carved by Gian Francesco Testi. The 16th century organ was made by Giovanni Battista Facchetti. 

The monastery was suppressed during the French invasion of 1796, but re-opened with the restoration of the Duke of Modena. The monastery was again closed in 1866, although benedictines have remained parish priests.

References

Roman Catholic churches completed in 1518
Christian monasteries established in the 10th century
Benedictine monasteries in Italy
Monasteries in Emilia-Romagna
Roman Catholic churches in Modena
Renaissance architecture in Emilia-Romagna
10th-century establishments in Italy
Religious buildings and structures completed in 918